Rudolf Dovny Ndualu (born 22 July 1999) is a German professional footballer who plays as a midfielder for SV Babelsberg.

Career
He moved to MSV Duisburg in the summer of 2021. He made his professional debut in the 3. Liga on 8 August 2021, in the home match against TSV Havelse. in August 2022, after his contract was voided, he moved to SV Babelsberg.

Career statistics

References

External links

1999 births
Living people
Sportspeople from Brandenburg an der Havel
German footballers
Association football midfielders
Footballers from Brandenburg
Tennis Borussia Berlin players
FC Viktoria 1889 Berlin players
MSV Duisburg players
SV Babelsberg 03 players
3. Liga players
Regionalliga players
Oberliga (football) players